ICC World XI, World XI, Rest of the World, or similar names, may refer to the following cricket teams:
Annual all-star selections
 ICC Test Team of the Year, since 2004
 ICC ODI Team of the Year, also since 2004
Teams that played matches
 Rest of the World cricket team in England in 1970, and briefer tours occurring in the 1960s, including in 1966 and 1967
 Rest of the World cricket team in Australia in 1971–72
 World Series Cricket World XI, competed in World Series Cricket 1978–79
 Sport Aid 1986 team v. West Indies
 Victorian Cricket Association centenary ODI v. Australia in 1995-96
 World Cricket Tsunami Appeal 2005 ODI v. Asia XI; also unofficial teams in ODIs v. New Zealand, MCC, and Asia XI
 2005 ICC Super Series, World XI played 3 ODIs and one Test against Australia
 2017 Independence Cup, a T20I series in Pakistan
 Hurricane Relief T20 Challenge, a one-off T20I match in England
 Mujib 100 T20 Cup Bangladesh 2020, two matches against an Asia XI team
Wisden All-Time World Test XI

Wisden All-Time World Test XI

See also
 List of World XI Test cricketers
 List of World XI ODI cricketers
 List of World XI Twenty20 International cricketers
 :Category:Multi-national teams in international cricket

References